Kultura is a defunct Polish émigré literary journal.

Kultura may also refer to:

Kultura (newspaper) a Russian newspaper
Kultura (TV channel), now Russia-K, a Russian television station
Kultura (Ukrainian television channel) or UA:Kultura
Kultura, a 1994 album by the Ukrainians